Kokoï is a town in the Pompoï Department of Balé Province in southern Burkina Faso. As of 1996, the town has a total population of 1,027.

References

External links
Satellite map at Maplandia.com

Populated places in the Boucle du Mouhoun Region
Balé Province